The 1934 NFL Championship Game, also known as the Sneakers Game, was the second scheduled National Football League (NFL) championship game. Played at the Polo Grounds in New York City on December 9, it was the first title game for the newly created Ed Thorp Memorial Trophy. With a remarkable fourth quarter, the New York Giants defeated the Chicago Bears 30–13.

Game summary
The defending champion Bears entered the game undefeated at 13–0, with an 18-game winning streak. The Giants (8–5) won consecutive division titles, but had lost their final regular season game at Philadelphia. The Bears were favored to repeat as champions.

A freezing rain the night before the game froze the Polo Grounds field. After Giants end Ray Flaherty remarked to head coach Steve Owen that sneakers would provide better footing on the frozen playing surface, Owen sent his friend Abe Cohen, a tailor who assisted on the Giants sideline, to Manhattan College to get some sneakers. There, Brother Jasper, the athletic director (and the later namesake of the Manhattan Jaspers) emptied the lockers of the school's basketball team.  Cohen arrived in the third quarter with nine pairs of basketball sneakers from the college.

The Bears led 10–3 at the half when the Giants switched to the basketball sneakers. A Chicago field goal was the only score in the third quarter, extending the lead to ten points. Early in the fourth, Giants quarterback Ed Danowski threw a touchdown pass to Ike Frankian to close the score to 13–10. (The pass was momentarily intercepted at the Bears' 2-yard line, but Frankian was there to snatch the ball out of the defender's hands.) On the next New York drive, running back Ken Strong scored on a 42-yard touchdown run. Later Strong had another touchdown run. The Giants scored for a final time on Danowski's 9-yard run, a fourth unanswered touchdown. New York scored 27 points in the 4th quarter and won 30–13. The Giants 27 fourth quarter points in a championship game set an NFL record that still stands today.

Scoring summary
Sunday, December 9, 1934
Kickoff: 2 p.m. EST

First quarter
NYG – FG Ken Strong 38, 3–0 NYG
Second quarter
CHI – Bronko Nagurski 1 run (Jack Manders kick), 7–3 CHI
CHI – FG Manders 17, 10–3 CHI
Third quarter
CHI – FG Manders 22, 13–3 CHI
Fourth quarter
NYG – Ike Frankian 28 pass from Ed Danowski (Strong kick), 13–10 CHI
NYG – Strong 42 run (Strong kick), 17–13 NYG
NYG – Strong 11 run (kick failed), 23–13 NYG
NYG – Danowski 9 run (Bo Molenda kick), 30–13 NYG

Officials
Referee: Bobby Cahn
Umpire: George Lowe
Head Linesman: George Vergara
Field Judge: M.J. Meyer 

Players' shares
The projected attendance of 55,000 was not reached, as the week's weather kept it under 36,000. Each player on the winning Giants team received $621 (equivalent to $ in ), while the Bears received $414 (equivalent to $ in ) each.

Aftermath
This was the Giants second NFL championship, and the first time they won a championship game. After the game, Abe Cohen promptly returned the sneakers to Manhattan College so the basketball team could practice the next day.

Many of the participants have been interviewed since the game took place, most notably Bronko Nagurski of the Bears and Mel Hein of the Giants.  Generally, players from both sides have attributed the Giants' second-half dominance to their selection of footwear. As Nagurski put it later, "We immediately said something was wrong because they suddenly had good footing and we didn't...they just out-smarted us." A mini-documentary of the game, narrated by Pat Summerall, can be seen in the 1987 video "Giants Among Men." NFL Films named the game the #8 bad weather game of all time, and in 2019, it was named the #62 greatest game in NFL history.

References

Total Football: The Official Encyclopedia of the National Football League
The Sporting News Complete Super Bowl Book 1995
Strange But True Football Stories
Cavanaugh, Jack (2008), Giants Among Men. New York:Random House. 
 Pervin, Lawrence A. (2009). Football's New York Giants. Jefferson, NC: McFarland and Company, Inc. 

Chicago Bears postseason
New York Giants postseason
National Football League Championship games
Championship Game
NFL Championship Game
Sports in Manhattan
American football competitions in New York City
NFL Championship Game
1930s in Manhattan
Washington Heights, Manhattan